Milovan Obradović (Serbian Cyrillic: Милован Обрадовић; born 4 May 1956) is a Yugoslav former professional footballer who played as a defender.

Honours
Radnički Niš
 Balkans Cup: 1975

References

External links
 

Association football defenders
FK Radnički Niš players
FK Vojvodina players
Serbian footballers
Yugoslav First League players
Yugoslav footballers
Yugoslavia international footballers
1956 births
Living people